Clamator is a genus of large brood-parasitic cuckoos with crests and graduated tails.

The genus was erected by German naturalist Johann Jakob Kaup in 1829 with the great spotted cuckoo (Clamator glandarius) as the type species.  The name Clamator is Latin for "shouter" from clamare, "to shout".

There are four species:

Clamator cuckoos are found in warmer parts of southern Europe and Asia, and in Africa south of the Sahara Desert. These are birds of warm open scrubby habitats, but some species are at least partially migratory, leaving for warmer and wetter areas in winter.

They are strikingly patterned with black, white and brown plumage. The sexes are similar but the juvenile plumages are distinctive. The two African species each also have two distinct colour morphs, light and dark.

All the Clamator cuckoos are brood parasites, which lay a single egg in the nests of medium-sized hosts, such as magpies, starlings, shrikes, laughingthrushes, bulbuls and babblers, depending on location. Unlike the common cuckoo, neither the hen nor the hatched chick of Clamator species evict the host's eggs, but the host's young often die because they cannot compete successfully with the cuckoo for food.

These are noisy birds, with persistent and loud calls. They feed on large insects, with hairy caterpillars, which are distasteful to many birds, being a speciality.

References

 
Bird genera